Amphipyra is a genus of moths in the family Noctuidae, the only genus in the tribe Amphipyrini.

Selected species
 Amphipyra acheron Draudt, 1950
 Amphipyra albicilia Hampson, 1894
 Amphipyra albolineola Yoshimoto, 1993
 Amphipyra alpherakii (Staudinger, 1888)
 Amphipyra amentet Babics, Benedek & Saldaitis, 2013
 Amphipyra anophthalma Boursin, 1963
 Amphipyra averna Hreblay & Ronkay, 1997
 Amphipyra berbera Rungs, 1949 – Svensson's copper underwing
 Amphipyra boursini Hacker, 1998
 Amphipyra brunneoatra Strand, 1916
 Amphipyra cancellata Warren, 1911
 Amphipyra charon Draudt, 1950
 Amphipyra cinnamomea (Goeze, 1781)
 Amphipyra costiplaga Draudt, 1950
 Amphipyra cupreipennis Moore, 1882
 Amphipyra deleta Draudt, 1950
 Amphipyra deletaiwana Hreblay & Ronkay, 1998
 Amphipyra effusa Boisduval, 1829
 Amphipyra erebina Butler, 1878
 Amphipyra formosana Hacker & Ronkay, 1998
 Amphipyra fuscusa Chang, 1989
 Amphipyra glabella (Morrison, 1874) – grey amphipyra or smooth amphipyra
 Amphipyra herrichschaefferi Hacker & Peks, 1998
 Amphipyra herzigi Hreblay & Ronkay, 1998
 Amphipyra horiei Owada, 1996
 Amphipyra jankowskii Oberthür, 1884
 Amphipyra kautti Hacker, 2002
 Amphipyra livida (Denis & Schiffermüller, 1775)
 Amphipyra magna Walker, 1865
 Amphipyra marmorea Hreblay & Ronkay, 1998
 Amphipyra micans Lederer, 1857
 Amphipyra microlitha Hreblay & Ronkay, 1998
 Amphipyra molybdea Christoph, 1867
 Amphipyra monochroma Yoshimoto, 1993
 Amphipyra monolitha Guenée, 1852
 Amphipyra okinawensis Sugi, 1982
 Amphipyra owadai Hreblay, Peregovits & Ronkay, 1999
 Amphipyra pallidipennis Hreblay & Ronkay, 1998
 Amphipyra perflua (Fabricius, 1787)
 Amphipyra porphyrea Hreblay & Ronkay, 1998
 Amphipyra pyramidea (Linnaeus, 1758) – copper underwing, humped green fruitworm, or pyramidal green fruitworm
 Amphipyra pyramidoides Guenée, 1852 – copper underwing
 Amphipyra schrenckii Ménétriés, 1859
 Amphipyra sergei (Staudinger, 1888)
 Amphipyra shyrshana Chang, 1989
 Amphipyra stix Herrich-Schäffer, 1850
 Amphipyra striata Bremer & Grey, 1853
 Amphipyra strigata D. S. Fletcher, 1968
 Amphipyra subtrigua Bremer & Grey, 1853
 Amphipyra suryai Yoshimoto, 1993
 Amphipyra tetra (Fabricius, 1787)
 Amphipyra tragopoginis (Clerck, 1759) – mouse moth
 Amphipyra tripartita Butler, 1878

References

Noctuidae
 
Noctuoidea genera